Foundation's Friends, Stories in Honor of Isaac Asimov is a 1989 book written in honor of science fiction author Isaac Asimov, in the form of an anthology of short stories set in Asimov's universes, particularly the Foundation universe. The anthology was edited by Martin H. Greenberg, and contributing authors include Ray Bradbury, Robert Silverberg, Frederik Pohl, Poul Anderson, Harry Turtledove, and Orson Scott Card.  It commemorated Asimov's 50th anniversairy as an author. A number of writers who contributed to the anthology are also portrayed on the book's cover.

A "revised and expanded" edition was published in 1997, which added numerous memorials and appreciations written by those who knew him, many of them well-known authors and editors from the science fiction field.

 Hardback:  
 Paperback:  
 Revised and Expanded Edition (Paperback):

Reception 
David Langford commented brielfy on the anthology, noting it contains "a lot of routine pastiche" as well as several gems. He criticized Poul Anderson's story as "too finicky", but praised Orson Scott Card's work as "the best Foundation/Empire story ever written". Jo Walton likewise commented on the anthology in passing, choosing Frederik Pohl and Connie Willis' stories as its best.

Table of contents

Contents added to the revised and expanded edition

See also
 Festschrift, a book honoring a respected person

References

External links
Foundation's Friends book, almost complete
Review of Foundation's Friends: In Honor of Isaac Asimov

Foundation universe books
1989 books
Martin H. Greenberg anthologies
Festschrifts